A Love, A Thief, A Department Store (German: Ein Lieb, ein Dieb, ein Warenhaus) is a 1928 German silent romance film directed by Karl Theodor Wagner.

Cast
In alphabetical order
 Helene Brahms 
 Colette Brettel 
 Harry Gondi 
 Eric Harden 
 Rudolf Klein-Rhoden 
 Madeleine Lavallier
 Robert Staerk 
 Karel Stepanek

References

Bibliography
 Alfred Krautz. International directory of cinematographers, set- and costume designers in film, Volume 4. Saur, 1984.

External links

1928 films
Films of the Weimar Republic
German silent feature films
1920s romance films
German romance films
German black-and-white films
1920s German films